The General Motors 60° V6 engine family is a series of 60° V6 engines produced for both longitudinal and transverse applications. All of these engines are 12-valve cam-in-block or overhead valve engines, except for the LQ1; which uses 24 valves driven by dual overhead cams. Production of these engines began in 1980 and ended in 2005 in the U.S., with production continued in China until 2010. This engine family was the basis for the GM High Value engine family. These engines have also been referred to as the X engines due to their first usage in the X-body cars.

This engine is not related to the GMC V6 engine that was designed for commercial vehicle usage.

This engine family was developed by Chevrolet although it was used by all of GM's divisions.

Generation I
The first generation of modern small GM 60° V6 engines featured an iron block and heads with inline valves. This "clean sheet" design was introduced in 1980 and versions were produced through 1995. Two different blocks with minor differences were developed:
 A transverse engine family for front-wheel drive
 A longitudinal engine family for rear-wheel drive

Transverse
The transverse engines began the 60° family in 1980. Like the rest of the Generation I engines, they were updated in 1985 with larger main journals for durability, along with multi-point fuel injection or E2SE carb and OBD I. Production of the Generation I transverse engines ended in 1986.

LE2
The  LE2 was the first version of the 60° engine. It was a transverse version produced from 1980 through 1986 for the A-body and X-body cars. The standard ("X-code") engine for this line, it used a two-barrel carburetor.

Applications:
 1980–1985 Buick Skylark
 1986 Buick Century
 1986 Oldsmobile Cutlass Ciera & Cutlass Cruiser
 1980–1984 Oldsmobile Omega
 1980–1984 Pontiac Phoenix
 1980–1985 Chevrolet Citation
 1982–1986 Pontiac 6000
 1982–1986 Chevrolet Celebrity

LH7
Introduced in 1981, the  LH7 was a High Output ("Z-code") version of the LE2 for the higher-performance X-cars like the Chevrolet Citation X-11 and higher-performance A-cars like the Pontiac 6000 STE. The LH7 was replaced after 1984 with the MFI L44.

Applications:
 1982–1984 Buick Skylark T-Type
 1982–1984 Oldsmobile Omega SX
 1982–1984 Pontiac Phoenix SJ/SE
 1981–1984 Chevrolet Citation X-11
 1984      Chevrolet Celebrity (optional on first year Eurosport) 
 1983–1984 Pontiac 6000 STE
 1989–1991 Isuzu Trooper/Trooper II

L44

The L44 was produced from 1985 to 1988, replacing the LH7. It was the first transverse  to use multiport fuel injection, and was a High Output ("9-code") engine option for the higher performance A-cars, X-cars, and Pontiac Fiero.

Applications:
 1985–1988 Pontiac Fiero
 1985–1986 Pontiac 6000 STE
 1985–1986 Chevrolet Celebrity Eurosport
 1985 Chevrolet Citation X-11

LB6
The LB6 engine was introduced in 1985 to replace the original LE2. It used multiport fuel injection and produced .

Applications:

1985–1986 Cadillac Cimarron
1985–1994 Chevrolet Cavalier
1985 Chevrolet Citation
1985 Buick Skylark (sedan)
1985-1986 Chevrolet Celebrity
1985-1986 Pontiac 6000
1985–1987 Oldsmobile Firenza (GT)

LG6
The LG6 ("D-code") was produced from 1990 to 1996 in both transverse and longitudinal applications. It used throttle-body fuel injection and iron heads.

Applications:
1990–1995 Chevrolet Lumina APV
1990–1995 Oldsmobile Silhouette
1990–1995 Pontiac Trans Sport
1990–1992 Isuzu Rodeo
1991–1994 Isuzu Pup

Longitudinal
The longitudinal versions had minor differences from the transverse engines on which they were based. This group appeared in 1982 with the LC1 and LR2 and never added the aluminum heads of the Generation II engines.

Like the rest of the family, larger journals appeared in 1985, along with multiport fuel injection for the F-body LB8 version. TBI was added for the truck version in 1986.
A  version was added in 1990 with an  longer stroke (now 84mm), and a  appeared for 1993 with a  bore and SFI. Production ended for all longitudinal 60° V6s in 1996. GM's performance-parts division continued production of a related crate engine after 1999.

2.8 Applications:
 1986-1993 Chevrolet S-10
 1986-1993 GMC S-15/GMC Sonoma
 1986-1993 Chevrolet S-10 Blazer
 1986-1993 GMC S-15 Jimmy
 1988-1991 Isuzu Trooper II

3.1 Applications:
 1991-1992 Isuzu Rodeo
 1991-1994 Isuzu Pickup

LC1
The longitudinal LC1 was produced from 1982 to 1984. It was a 2-barrel High Output ("1-code") version for the F-body cars. It was replaced by the LB8 for 1985.

Applications:
 1982–1984 Chevrolet Camaro
 1982–1984 Pontiac Firebird

LR2
The longitudinal LR2 was a truck version ("B-code") produced from 1982 to 1990.

Applications:
 1982–1986 Chevrolet S-10/Chevrolet S-10 Blazer
 1982–1986 GMC S-15/GMC S-15 Jimmy
 1984–1986 Jeep Cherokee
 1986 Jeep Comanche

LL1/LL2
The longitudinal LL1 was a high-output version of the LC1 produced in 1983 and 1984.

Applications:
1983–1984 Pontiac Firebird

The carbureted LL2 ("R-code") was produced from 1982 to 1988. Another LL2 ("R-code") with throttle-body fuel injection was produced from 1986 to 1993.
Applications:
 1986–1993 Chevrolet S-10/Chevrolet S-10 Blazer
 1986–1993 GMC S-15/GMC S-15 Jimmy
 1989–1991 Isuzu Trooper

LB8
The LB8 ("S-code") replaced the LC1 in 1985 and was produced until 1989. It used multiport fuel injection and was made for longitudinal mounting.

Applications:
 1985–1989 Chevrolet Camaro
 1985–1989 Pontiac Firebird

LH0
The LH0 as used in the rear-wheel drive applications differed significantly from that used in front-wheel drive applications. The latter retained the Generation-I architecture block and heads.

Applications:
 1990–1992 Chevrolet Camaro
 1990–1992 Pontiac Firebird
 1990-1992 Oldsmobile Cutlass Ciera S

L32
The F-body cars used the Generation I architecture, with iron heads, and without splayed valves.

Applications:
 1993–1994 Chevrolet Camaro (California models)
 1993–1995 Chevrolet Camaro 
 1993–1994 Pontiac Firebird (California models)
 1993–1995 Pontiac Firebird

Generation II
The second generation, still , was introduced in 1987. It used aluminum heads with splayed valves and an aluminum front cover. It was produced exclusively for transverse, front-wheel drive use. An even higher displacement DOHC  LQ1 was also developed, and eventually, the new GM High Value engine family followed. Production of OHV Generation II engines ended in 1994 after the introduction of the Generation III in 1993.

LB6
The  60° V6 was used in these vehicles:
 1987–1989 Buick Century
 1988–1989 Buick Regal
 1987–1988 Cadillac Cimarron
 1987–1989 Chevrolet Beretta
 1987–1989 Chevrolet Cavalier Z24
 1990–1994 Mexican Chevrolet Cavalier
 1987–1989 Chevrolet Celebrity
 1987–1989 Chevrolet Corsica
 1987–1989 Oldsmobile Cutlass Ciera
 1988–1989 Oldsmobile Cutlass Supreme
 1987–1989 Pontiac 6000
 1988–1989 Pontiac Grand Prix

LH0
The LH0 ("T-code") was introduced in 1988 on the Pontiac 6000 STE AWD, featuring more advanced multi-port fuel injection. It was produced until 1994 (1996 for the Mexican market) and was exported in some models.

Applications:
1989–1993 Buick Regal
1990–1993 Chevrolet Beretta
1990–1994 Chevrolet Cavalier
1990 Chevrolet Celebrity
1990–1993 Chevrolet Corsica
1990–1994 Chevrolet Lumina
1989–1993 Oldsmobile Cutlass Supreme
1988–1991 Pontiac 6000 (STE AWD 1988-89, all models 1990-91)
1989–1993 Pontiac Grand Prix
1991–1994 Pontiac Sunbird
1990–1996 Chevrolet Cutlass (Mexico) 
1990–1996 Chevrolet Century (Mexico)

L64
The two versions were one that could run M85 and one that could run E85.

Uses:
1991–1993 Chevrolet Lumina VFV 
1992–1993 Chevrolet Lumina E85 VFV

LG5
The LG5 ("V-code") was a special  turbocharged engine produced with McLaren for the 1989 and 1990 model years.
Around 3,700 engines were produced each year. This engine had a block with more nickel content and hardened internals.

Applications:
1989–1990 Pontiac Grand Prix Turbo
1990 Pontiac Grand Prix Turbo STE

LQ1

The LQ1 (also called the Twin Dual Cam or TDC) was a  DOHC V6 engine ("X-code") based on the aluminum-headed second generation of GM's 60° engine line, sharing a similar block with its pushrod cousins, the 3.1 L LH0 V6 and the then recently retired  LB6 V6. The engine was built only for front-wheel drive applications, and was featured exclusively in the first generation of GM's W-body platform.

It was built from 1991 to 1997. In 1996, the heads were redesigned for better flow, as well as now making the engine an interference design and adapting the engine for federally mandated OBDII emissions. It had four valves per cylinder. The  engine substituted the standard camshaft for a chain driven intermediate shaft, which drives four overhead cams via a cogged belt. Adapting the 60°pushrod block for the LQ1's overhead cams significantly increased packaged engine height.

Only a few interchangeable parts are use between this DOHC engine and other members of the 60° family, primarily the connecting rods and crankshaft.

The heads and intake manifolds were redesigned for the 1996 model year, incorporating a larger throttle body and plenum area, slightly longer intake runners, cloverleaf combustion chambers, and larger "pill"-shaped exhaust ports. Camshafts and cam timing were also revised for the new, higher-rpm powerband.

Optional from 1991 to 1993 was a Getrag 284 five-speed manual transaxle, which was also exclusive to the GM W platform and was available only with the LQ1. The electronically controlled Hydramatic 4T60-E four-speed automatic transaxle was the alternative, used during the entire production run with the exception of the 1997 Monte Carlo Z34 and 1997 Lumina LTZ, which received the 4T65-E.

Applications:
 1991–1997 Chevrolet Lumina
 1995–1997 Chevrolet Monte Carlo
 1991–1996 Oldsmobile Cutlass Supreme
 1991–1996 Pontiac Grand Prix

Generation III
The third generation of the 60° engine was introduced in the 1993 Oldsmobile Cutlass Supreme. Like its predecessors, it continued to use an overhead valve configuration with two valves per cylinder, a cast-iron cylinder block, aluminum cylinder heads, and an aluminum intake manifold. However, the heads and intake manifold were redesigned for better air flow, the cylinder block was stiffened, and the flat-tappets of the generation I and II engines were replaced with roller tappets. This generation also came standard with sequential multiport fuel injection and structural oil pan.

3.1 L/3100

L82
The L82 ("M-code") was an updated, SFI replacement for the MPFI LH0, produced from 1993 through 1999. It featured a structural oil pan, a stiffer redesigned engine block, sequential fuel injection, and revised aluminum heads.
Applications:
 1994–1999 Buick Century
 1994–1996 Buick Regal
 1994–1998 Buick Skylark
 1994–1996 Chevrolet Beretta
 1994–1996 Chevrolet Corsica
 1995–1999 Chevrolet Lumina
 1997–1999 Chevrolet Malibu
 1995–1999 Chevrolet Monte Carlo
 1994–1998 Oldsmobile Achieva
 1997–1999 Oldsmobile Cutlass GLS
 1994–1996 Oldsmobile Cutlass Ciera
 1993–1997 Oldsmobile Cutlass Supreme (1993 received both LH0 and L82  motors)
 1994–1998 Pontiac Grand Am
 1994–1999 Pontiac Grand Prix

LG8

The LG8 ("J-code") was an updated version of the engine that displaced . It still had an iron block and two-valve pushrod aluminum heads and full sequential port fuel injection. The LG8 also featured a new intake manifold and numerous changes to improve parts-sharing with the larger-displacement LA1 3400. Emissions were improved with secondary air injection and it earned LEV status. The engine featured a  bore and a  stroke and a 9.6:1 compression ratio. The LG8 was built in Ramos Arizpe, Coahuila, Mexico and Tonawanda, New York.

Applications:
 2000–2005 Buick Century
 1999–2003 Chevrolet Malibu
 2000–2001 Chevrolet Lumina
 2000–2003 Pontiac Grand Prix SE

3.4/3400

LA1

The LA1 or 3400 ("E-code") was a larger-bore version of the L82. It was first used on the 1996 U-platform minivans. It displaces  and has  bore and stroke with a 9.5:1 compression ratio. Emissions are controlled via a catalytic converter and exhaust gas recirculation; however, the Pontiac Aztek and Buick Rendezvous do not use the latter. Fuel shut-off is at 6000 rpm. Starting around 2000, most vehicles are equipped with GM's Engine Oil Life Monitor. This engine was assembled at both Tonawanda engine and the Mexican Ramos Arizpe engine plant.

Applications:
 2002–2005 Buick Rendezvous
 2000–2005 Chevrolet Impala
 2000–2005 Chevrolet Monte Carlo
 1996 Chevrolet Lumina Minivan
 1997–2005 Chevrolet Venture
 1999–2004 Oldsmobile Alero
 1996–2004 Oldsmobile Silhouette
 2001–2005 Pontiac Aztek
 1999–2005 Pontiac Grand Am
 1999–2005 Pontiac Montana
 1996–1998 Pontiac Trans Sport

Production in China by SAIC-GM
GM partnered with SAIC Motor to form SAIC-GM in 1997. This partnership manufactured variants of the 60° V6 engine in China, primarily for use in Chinese market GM products. Chinese-built LNJ engines were used in the US for the 2005-2009 Chevrolet Equinox and Pontiac Torrent.

LB8 

The LB8 is General Motors' base V6 in China. It remains an iron block with pushrods and an aluminum two-valve head.

Applications:
 Buick GL/GLX (China)
 Buick GL8 (China)
 Buick Regal (China)

LW9 

Applications:
 Buick GL/GLX (China)
 Buick GL8 (China)

LNJ 
An updated version of the Generation III 3400 engine. It includes a new block, intake manifold, oil pan, engine cover, and fuel system, as well as electronic throttle control. It was built in China and shipped to Canada for installation in the Chevrolet Equinox and Pontiac Torrent.

Applications:

 2005-2009 Chevrolet Equinox
 2006-2009 Pontiac Torrent

See also
 GM High Value engine - the new generation of the GM 60° V6, including the "3900" and variable valve timing-enhanced engines
 Chevrolet 90° V6 engine
 GM engines
 List of GM bellhousing patterns#GM metric pattern

References

Road and Track Magazine, April 1989. (1989-1990 Turbo Grand Prix performance figures)
1995 Corsica/Beretta Service Manual, 1994, General Motors Corporation (Gen III/L82 Engine's usage in Corsica/Beretta)

External links

 60degreev6.com

60-Degree V6
V6 engines
Gasoline engines by model